The 2015 WNBA season for the Tulsa Shock of the WNBA was the first winning season for the Shock franchise in Tulsa.  It culminated with a first-ever visit to the WNBA playoffs in September 2015. The Shock were swept by the Phoenix Mercury in the first round. 

Midway through the 2015 season, on July 20, 2015, Shock majority owner Bill Cameron announced that the franchise would relocate to Dallas-Fort Worth for the 2016 WNBA season.

WNBA draft

The Tulsa Shock selected Amanda Zahui B., a native of Stockholm, Sweden who played at the University of Minnesota, in the first round as the second overall pick in the 2015 WNBA Draft. In the second round, the Shock selected Brianna Kiesel as the thirteenth overall pick. As the twenty-fifth overall pick, in the third round, the Shock selected Mimi Mungedi.

Roster

 Head coach: Fred Williams (College - Boise State)
 Assistant coaches
 Bridget Pettis (College - Florida)
 Ed Baldwin (College - North Carolina Central)
 Strength-and-Conditioning Coach: Claus Souza (College - Tulsa)
 Athletic trainer: Allison Russell (College - Tulsa)

Season standings

References

Tulsa Shock seasons
Tulsa
Tulsa Shock